This is a list of Israeli ambassadors to France.

Following the 1948 Arab–Israeli War, France recognised Israel in January 1949, and the first Israeli ambassador to France, Maurice Fischer, was appointed in 1949.
 Maurice Fischer (1949–1952)
 Jacob Tsur (1952–1959)
 Walter Eytan (1960–1970)
 Asher Ben-Natan (1970–1974)
 Mordechai Gazit (1974–1979)
 Meir Rosenne (1979–1983)
 Ovadia Soffer (1983–1992)
 Yehuda Lancry (1992–1995)
 Avi Pazner (1995–1998)
 Eliahu Ben-Elissar (1998–2000)
 Élie Barnavi (2001–2003)
 Nissim Zvili (2003–2005)
 Daniel Shek (2006–2010
 Yossi Gal (2010–2015)
 Aliza Bin-Noun (2015–2019)
 Yael German (2021-2022)

See also 
 France–Israel relations
 List of French ambassadors to Israel

References

External links 
 Israeli ambassador to France.

 
Jewish French history
France, List of
Israel